Mrs. Claus (also known as Mrs. Santa Claus or Mrs. Santa) is the legendary wife of Santa Claus, the Christmas gift-bringer in Western Christmas tradition.
She is known for making cookies with the elves, caring for the reindeer, and preparing toys with her husband.

History

Origin 
The wife of Santa Claus is first mentioned in the short story "A Christmas Legend" (1849), by James Rees, a Philadelphia-based Christian missionary. In the story, an old man and woman, both carrying a bundle on the back, are given shelter in a home on Christmas Eve as weary travelers. The next morning, the children of the house find an abundance of gifts for them, and the couple is revealed to be not "old Santa Claus and his wife", but the hosts' long-lost elder daughter and her husband in disguise.

Mrs. Santa Claus is mentioned by name in the pages of the Yale Literary Magazine in 1851, where the student author (whose name is given only as "A. B.") writes of the appearance of Santa Claus at a Christmas party:
[I]n bounded that jolly, fat and funny old elf, Santa Claus. His array was indescribably fantastic. He seemed to have done his best, and we should think, had Mrs. Santa Claus to help him.

An account of a Christmas musicale at the State Lunatic Asylum in Utica, New York in 1854 included an appearance by Mrs. Santa Claus, with baby in arms, who danced to a holiday song.

A passing reference to Mrs. Santa Claus was made in an essay in Harper's Magazine in 1862; and in the comic novel The Metropolites (1864) by Robert St. Clar, she appears in a woman's dream, wearing "Hessian high boots, a dozen of short, red petticoats, an old, large, straw bonnet" and bringing the woman a wide selection of finery to wear.

A woman who may or may not be Mrs. Santa Claus appeared in the children's book Lill in Santa Claus Land and Other Stories by Ellis Towne, Sophie May and Ella Farman, published in Boston in 1878. In the story, little Lill describes her imaginary visit to Santa's office (not in the Arctic, incidentally):
 "There was a lady sitting by a golden desk, writing in a large book, and Santa Claus was looking through a great telescope, and every once in a while he stopped and put his ear to a large speaking-tube.

 "Presently he said to the lady, 'Put down a good mark for Sarah Buttermilk. I see she is trying to conquer her quick temper.'

Two bad ones for Isaac Clappertongue; he'll drive his mother to the insane asylum yet.

Later, Lill's sister Effie ponders the tale:

 Effie sank back in the chair to think. She wished Lill had found out how many black marks she had, and whether that lady was Mrs. Santa Claus—and had, in fact, obtained more accurate information about many things.

Much as in The Metropolites, Mrs. Santa Claus appears in a dream of the author Eugene C. Gardner in his article "A Hickory Back-Log" in Good Housekeeping magazine (1887), with an even more detailed description of her dress:
 She was dressed for traveling and for cold weather. Her hood was large and round and red but not smooth, — it was corrugated; that is to say, it consisted of a series of rolls nearly as large as my arm, passing over her head sidewise, growing smaller toward the back until they terminated in a big button that was embellished with a knot of green ribbon. Its general appearance was not unlike that of the familiar, pictorial beehive except that the rolls were not arranged spirally. The broad, white ruffle of her lace cap projected several inches beyond the front of the hood and waved back and forth like the single leaves of a great white poppy, as she nodded emphatically in her discourse.

 Her outer garment was a bright colored plaid worsted cloak reaching to within about six inches of the floor. Its size was most voluminous, but its fashion was extremely simple. It had a wide yoke across the shoulders, into which the broad plain breadths were gathered; and it was fastened at the throat by a huge ornamented brass hook and eye, from which hung a short chain of round twisted links. Her right arm protruded through a vertical slit at the side of the cloak and she held in her hand a sheet of paper covered with figures. The left arm on which she carried a large basket or bag — I couldn't tell which — was hidden by the ample folds of the garment. Her countenance was keen and nervous, but benignant.

Mrs. Claus proceeds to instruct the architect Gardner on the ideal modern kitchen, a plan of which he includes in the article.

Santa Claus' wife made her most active appearance yet by Katharine Lee Bates in her poem "Goody Santa Claus on a Sleigh Ride" (1889). "Goody" is short for "Goodwife", i.e., "Mrs."

21st century 
In 2018, there was an increasing demand for holiday appearances of Mrs. Claus as a standalone character separate from Santa Claus.

In popular media 

Since 1889, Mrs. Claus has been traditionally depicted in media as a fairly heavy-set, kindly, white-haired elderly female baking cookies or mending clothes somewhere in the background of the Santa Claus mythos. She sometimes assists in toy production and oversees Santa's elves. She is sometimes depicted in her youth to have had red hair. She is usually depicted wearing a fur dress of red or green.

Her reappearance in popular media in the 1960s began with the children's book How Mrs. Santa Claus Saved Christmas, by Phyllis McGinley. Today, Mrs. Claus is commonly seen in cartoons, on greeting cards, in knick-knacks such as Christmas tree ornaments, dolls, and salt and pepper shakers, in storybooks, in seasonal school plays and pageants, in parades, in a department store "Santa Lands" as a character adjacent to the throned Santa Claus, in television programs, and live-action and animated films that deal with Christmas and the world of Santa Claus. Her personality tends to be fairly consistent; she is usually seen as a calm, kind, and patient woman, often in contrast to Santa himself, who can be prone to acting too exuberant.

In more recent films such as The Santa Clause series, Fred Claus, and The Christmas Chronicles series, Mrs. Claus is not always depicted according to the elderly white-haired stereotype, but sometimes appears to be younger than Santa. In the case of The Christmas Chronicles, this is true despite the fact that Goldie Hawn, known for maintaining her youthful blonde appearance, is actually six years older than Kurt Russell who plays Santa.

Mrs. Claus departs even further from the stereotype in more recent films, such as the 2020 Mel Gibson film Fatman, where she is a black woman played by Marianne Jean-Baptiste.

Literature 
Mrs. Claus has appeared as a secondary character in children's books about Santa Claus and as the main character in titles about herself.

 Mrs. Santa Claus, Militant (one-act play) by Bell Elliott Palmer, 1914
 The Great Adventure of Mrs. Santa Claus by Sarah Addington and Gertrude A. Kay, 1923
 The Story of Santa Claus and Mrs. Claus and The Night Before Christmas by Alice and Lillian Desow Holland, 1946
 How Mrs. Santa Claus Saved Christmas by Phyllis McGinley, 1963
 Mrs. Santa Claus by Penny Ives, 1993
 A Bit of Applause for Mrs. Claus by Jeannie Schick-Jacobowitz, 2003
 The Story of Mrs. Santa Claus by Bethanie Tucker and Crystal McLaughlin, 2007
 Mrs. Claus Takes A Vacation by Linas Alsenas, 2008
 What Does Mrs. Claus Do? by Kate Wharton and Christian Slade, 2008
 Annalina: The Untold Story of Mrs. Claus by Adam Greenwood, 2011, tells the tale of the young woman who will one day become Mrs Claus. It has been adapted into a storybook for young children with coloring pictures and serves as the pilot for a series of novellas about various different characters from the story.
 Mrs. Claus Says by Nancy Claus, 2005–present, an ongoing series of children's books about life in the North pole, narrated by Mrs. Claus.

Films 
The first motion picture to depict Mrs. Claus was 1964's Santa Claus Conquers the Martians, where she was played by Doris Rich.
The 1970 stop-action animation Santa Claus Is Comin' to Town featured the red-haired Miss Jessica, a lovely schoolteacher who falls in love with and marries Kris Kringle, eventually becoming the classic Mrs. Claus.
The 1974 stop-action sequel The Year Without a Santa Claus starred Shirley Booth voicing the classic Mrs. Claus. This was remade in 2006 as a live-action film with Delta Burke playing Mrs. Claus.
In the 1984 TriStar Pictures film, The Night They Saved Christmas, Mrs. Claus, as played by June Lockhart to Art Carney's Santa, looked after the children when they visited the North Pole.
Mrs. Claus (played by Judy Cornwell) is also a character in 1985's Santa Claus: The Movie, where she played a vital role in the film's story. Her first name is Anya. It was her idea to give presents only to good children.
In the 1993 film The Nightmare Before Christmas, Mrs. Claus has a cameo appearance. She is seen in the kitchen of her and Santa Claus's home, preparing a lunch box and a vacuum flask for her husband to take to work.
The 2002 film The Santa Clause 2 centers on Tim Allen's character being forced to marry in order to continue his role as Santa. The "Mrs. Clause" confirms why every Santa has had a Mrs. Claus, because it is part of the Santa Clause. He ultimately finds genuine love in Carol Newman (Elizabeth Mitchell), the principal of his son Charlie's school, and in The Santa Clause 3: The Escape Clause, she deals with being Mrs. Claus, having a baby, and being separated from her family.
Played by Miranda Richardson in the 2007's Fred Claus (2007) starring Vince Vaughn and Paul Giamatti. Her name is Annette.
In Arthur Christmas, Mrs. Claus' first name is Margaret and is the wife of Malcolm (the current Santa) and mother of both the title character Arthur and his older brother Steve. She is depicted as much more efficient than her husband. She is voiced by Imelda Staunton.
Mrs. Claus (played by Goldie Hawn) makes an appearance in the 2018 Netflix movie The Christmas Chronicles (at the ending) and its sequel, The Christmas Chronicles 2 as one of the supporting characters. She is portrayed in the sequel as a white witch, practicing folk magic.
Mrs. Claus is played by Marianne Jean-Baptiste in the 2020 Mel Gibson film Fatman and her first name is given as Ruth.
Mrs. Claus, played by Monika Krzywkowska in 2021 Netflix film David and the Elves, is one of the main characters. She supports Santa and joins him on a journey to the real world to save one of the elves named Albert, who ran away from the North Pole. Mrs. Claus is a fashionable woman and also wants her husband to lead a healthy lifestyle. It is said that she and Santa have lived for over two thousand years.

Television 
Mrs. Claus appears in several of the Rankin/Bass stop-motion holiday specials. In Rudolph the Red-Nosed Reindeer (1964), she is seen as pestering her husband to eat, lest he becomes a "skinny Santa". In Santa Claus Is Comin' to Town (1970), she is introduced as a teacher named Jessica, who first meets Kris Kringle as a young man trying to deliver toys to a town ruled by a despot. She assists him and thus becomes a wanted fugitive herself with Kringle and his confederates. In light of this sacrifice, Jessica and Santa soon fall in love with each other and marry in the nearby forest. In The Year Without a Santa Claus (1974, voiced by Shirley Booth) and live-action remake (2006, played by Delta Burke), she has a prominent role showing a despondent Santa that there's still some Christmas spirit left in the world. Mrs. Claus also made appearances in several other Rankin/Bass specials, including Rudolph and Frosty's Christmas in July (1979).

Bea Arthur portrayed Mrs. Claus in a series of commercials for the Canadian drugstore chain Shoppers Drug Mart, part of Arthur's seven-year run as spokeswoman for the company between 1984 and 1991.

Angela Lansbury starred as the protagonist of the 1996 television musical Mrs. Santa Claus, with music and lyrics by Jerry Herman. Stranded in 1910 New York City, under the guise of Mrs. North, she marches for women's suffrage, and strikes to reform child labor in toy manufacturing. Anna Claus then joins Santa on an improved route around the world. 

In a highly uncharacteristic appearance, the 2005 episode "Billy and Mandy Save Christmas" depicts Mrs. Claus as Nancy, a powerful vampire who turns Santa undead. Another unusual appearance the same year is a Dragon Ball Z parody sketch in the Robot Chicken Christmas Special, where Mrs. Claus gains powers from the North Pole's radiation and becomes a giant monster.

In A Charlie Brown Christmas, Charlie Brown's sister Sally writes to Santa and asks, "How is your wife?" Later, in It's Christmastime Again, Charlie Brown, she writes Santa's wife herself, and, when Charlie Brown comments that some people call her "Mary Christmas", Sally congratulates her on choosing to keep her own surname. In Charlie Brown's Christmas Tales, Sally writes Santa Claus as "Samantha Claus", thinking that is her name.

Mrs. Claus appears in A Chipmunk Christmas, where she buys Alvin a harmonica after he gives his old one to a sick boy. Her identity isn't revealed until the end when Santa returns home and she greets him.

Boost Mobile created some controversy with an ad featuring Mrs. Claus in bed with a snowman. One version was briefly aired on late-night TV while two alternate versions were posted online. Ad Age had some commentary about the spot, including "This latest ad from Boost Mobile and agency 180, Los Angeles, features Mrs. Claus doing something very, very bad." Fox News commentator Bill O'Reilly, CNN and a number of local TV news channels commented about the ads.

She appears as a character in Duncanville where the eponymous character Duncan Harris has a crush on her and refers to her by her first name "Mary". This makes Santa (who she calls "Kris") jealous and come after Duncan with a shotgun.

Marks & Spencer 2016 Christmas campaign 
For 2016, British clothing and food company Marks & Spencer launched an integrated marketing campaign centered on a modern interpretation of Mrs. Claus. The campaign included a three-minute ad released on 11 November 2016 which sees Mrs. Claus receiving a letter from a seven-year-old child asking for help with a gift for his older sister, with whom the boy has a difficult relationship.

The ad depicts Mrs. Claus as more modern than previous examples, with her riding a snowmobile and flying a helicopter while Santa is out delivering gifts in the traditional sleigh. At the conclusion of the ad, she says to Santa "Well it wouldn't be fun if you knew all my secrets" suggesting she has a secret life assisting with Christmas present delivery. The brand also created a social media campaign in which Mrs. Claus answered requests and questions from members of the public.

The ad was received positively by customers and the press with many people commending the brand for taking a feminist approach to a traditional character.

The ad was directed by Academy-award winner Tom Hooper with Mrs Claus played by British actress Janet McTeer. Music was composed by Rachel Portman. The ad was created for Marks & Spencer by advertising agency Rainey Kelly Campbell Roalfe, a London-based division of Young & Rubican.

Music 
Nat King Cole released "Mrs. Santa Claus", with accompaniment by Nelson Riddle's orchestra, as the flipside of his 1953 single "The Little Boy That Santa Claus Forgot".

In contrast to her stereotypical portrayal, Mrs. Claus is portrayed as a woman bored with her relationship with Santa Claus in the song "Surabaya-Santa" from Jason Robert Brown's musical Songs for a New World and in the Oszkars' off-color song "Mrs. Claus has a Headache Again".

Comedy duo Cheech and Chong released "Santa Claus and His Old Lady" in 1971, with Cheech trying to explain (in his own way) the origin of Santa and Mrs. Claus to his always-stoned friend, Chong.

George Jones and Tammy Wynette released the 1987 single "Mr. and Mrs. Santa Claus", a love song with Jones and Wynette portraying the two characters.

Bob Rivers recorded "Me and Mrs. Claus", a parody of the soul song "Me and Mrs. Jones", for his 2002 album White Trash Christmas.

Bob Ricci recorded "Mrs. Claus", a parody of the pop hit "Stacy's Mom", for his 2005 recording Not a Christmas Album.
 
Robert Lopez and Kristen Anderson-Lopez wrote the song "A Hand for Mrs. Claus" as a duet for Idina Menzel and Ariana Grande for the 2019 album Christmas: A Season of Love.

Video games 
 In Saints Row IVs How the Saints Saved Christmas DLC, Mrs. Claus appears along with her husband. Her first name is revealed to be Janine. While she is mostly Santa's sweet, caring, and devoted wife, she is also a tough, capable fighter ("decking the halls" as Santa puts it), and unlike her husband quick to reveal the truth behind the nature of the "North Pole", the changes into standards of what is considered Naughty, what happened the one time Santa let someone else drive the sleigh with his reindeer, among other things. Her personality and attitude earn Mrs. Claus some respect from the Saints Boss.
 In The Simpsons Tapped Out, during the 2017 Christmas event, "The Invasion Before Christmas", Kodos disguises herself as Mrs. Claus. In an effort to take over Christmas after being left out of Halloween, the Rigellian duo, Kang and Kodos, steal the identity of Santa and his wife. As the final prize of act one of the event, the skin, "Mrs. Kodos Claus", is unlocked by collecting 17,700 Rigellian Batteries. The costume portrays Mrs. Claus in a red, short-sleeved outfit with glasses, slightly uneven lipstick, and a white mop hat. Upon unlocking the skin, the questline, "Claus-Et Homemaker", activates, in which Mrs. Kodos Claus attempts to impersonate Mrs. Claus by doing housewife-esque things, such as baking cookies and cleaning the house. Not being skilled in any of these areas, she inevitably fails and gives up, turning to day drinking. By the end of the questline, she hires a maid, Shauna, to clean the house. Having fully satirized a lazier modern housewife, Mrs. Kodos Claus eventually murders Shauna and uses her skull as a Holiday decoration.
 In Temple Run 2, as a portrayed gameplay character, which has been made in the celebration of Christmas.

See also 
 Santa Claus' daughter
 Santa Claus's reindeer

References

External links 

 Lill's Travels in Santa Claus Land, 1878, at Project Gutenberg
 Goody Santa Claus on a Sleigh-Ride, 1889, by Katherine Lee Bates, original edition and text.
 The Origin of American Christmas Myth and Customs

Santa Claus
Christmas characters
Santa's helpers
Christian folklore
Fictional housewives
Literary characters introduced in 1849
Legendary people
Female characters in literature